Commercial waste consists of waste from premises used mainly for the purposes of a trade or business or for the purpose of sport, recreation, education or entertainment, but excluding household, agricultural or industrial waste.

See also
Business waste
List of solid waste treatment technologies
List of Superfund sites in the United States
List of topics dealing with environmental issues
List of waste management companies
List of waste management topics
List of waste types
Pollution
Superfund

References

Waste